Boys Be is the second extended play from South Korean boy band Seventeen. It was released on September 10, 2015, by Pledis Entertainment. The album consists of five tracks, including the title track, "Mansae".

Commercial performance
The EP sold 169,833+ copies in South Korea. It peaked at number 2 on the Korean Gaon Chart and number 1 on the US World Billboard Chart.

Track listing

References 

2015 EPs
Korean-language EPs
Kakao M EPs
Seventeen (South Korean band) EPs
Hybe Corporation EPs